The 1967 Los Angeles Dodgers season marked the end of one of the franchise's most successful eras. One season after losing the World Series to the Baltimore Orioles, the Dodgers declined to a record of 73–89, and finished ahead of only the Houston Astros and the New York Mets in the National League race, 28½ games behind the NL and World Champion St. Louis Cardinals. It was the Dodgers' worst record since the war-affected 1944 season, and their worst peacetime record since 1937. The Dodgers would not return to the postseason until 1974.

Offseason 
 November 21, 1966: Wes Covington was released by the Dodgers.
 November 29, 1966: Tommy Davis and Derrell Griffith were traded by the Dodgers to the New York Mets for Ron Hunt and Jim Hickman.
 December 1, 1966: Maury Wills was traded by the Dodgers to the Pittsburgh Pirates for Bob Bailey and Gene Michael.
 December 15, 1966: Nick Willhite was traded by the Dodgers to the California Angels for Bob Lee.

Regular season

Season standings

Record vs. opponents

Opening Day lineup

Notable transactions 
 April 3, 1967: John Kennedy was traded by the Dodgers to the New York Yankees for Jack Cullen, John Miller and cash.
 May 10, 1967: Johnny Werhas was traded by the Dodgers to the California Angels for Len Gabrielson.
 May 31, 1967: Bob Lee was purchased from the Dodgers by the Cincinnati Reds.
 June 28, 1967: Von Joshua was signed by the Dodgers as an amateur free agent.

Roster

Season Recap 
The Dodgers were coming off back to back National League titles, but were mildly surprised by ace pitcher Sandy Koufax's retirement after the 1966 season.  Still, while not expected to be a contender in 1967, there was a solid nucleus that would have been expected to win in the neighborhood of 85 games. However, a couple of questionable trades (Tommy Davis for Ron Hunt, and Maury Wills for Bob Bailey and Gene Michael) further weakened an offense that was already considered below average.

In April, leading hitter and team home run leader Lou Johnson was injured sliding into home against the Braves and missed two months of the season. New shortstop Gene Michael batted .202, a full 100 points less than the man he replaced, as Maury Wills batted .302 for the Pirates. Ron Fairly, Willie Davis, and Bob Bailey all slumped off from their 1966 production; but one of the few bright spots was rookie Al Ferrara's .277 average and 16 home runs in just over half the season. Ultimately, the Dodgers scored fewer runs than any National League team except the last place Mets.

Despite the loss of Koufax, the pitching was generally solid, but the starters' won-loss records suffered from lack of run support despite solid ERAs. Rookie Bill Singer was 12–8 with a 2.64 ERA, Don Drysdale was 13–16 with a 2.74 ERA, and Claude Osteen was 17–17 with a 3.22 ERA. Don Sutton suffered from a "sophomore jinx", as he went 11–15 with a 3.95 ERA, nearly a full run higher than his 2.99 ERA in 1966.  The bullpen was led by Ron Perranoski, Jim Brewer, and Phil Regan, who combined for 23 saves and all had an ERA under 3.

The Dodgers lost 10 of their first 16 games and never got closer than 7 games out of 1st place. They were never able to top the .500 mark, and while they were a respectable 42–39 at home, they were a dismal 31–50 on the road.

Batting

Starters by position 
Note: Pos = Position; G = Games played; AB = At bats; H = Hits; Avg. = Batting average; HR = Home runs; RBI = Runs batted in

Other batters 
Note: G = Games played; AB = At bats; H = Hits; Avg. = Batting average; HR = Home runs; RBI = Runs batted in

Pitching

Starting pitchers 
Note: G = Games pitched; IP = Innings pitched; W = Wins; L = Losses; ERA = Earned run average; SO = Strikeouts

Other pitchers 
Note: G = Games pitched; IP = Innings pitched; W = Wins; L = Losses; ERA = Earned run average; SO = Strikeouts

Relief pitchers 
Note: G = Games pitched; W = Wins; L = Losses; SV = Saves; ERA = Earned run average; SO = Strikeouts

Awards and honors 
Gold Glove Award
Wes Parker, outfield

All-Stars 
1967 Major League Baseball All-Star Game
Don Drysdale reserve
Claude Osteen reserve

Farm system 

LEAGUE CHAMPIONS: Albuquerque, Ogden

1967 Major League Baseball Draft

This was the third year of a Major League Baseball Draft.  The Dodgers drafted 87 players in the June draft and 9 in the January draft. The top draft pick was third baseman Donnie Denbow from Southern Methodist University. He played in the Dodgers farm system through 1970. In 177 games in the rookie leagues and Class-A, he hit .242.

Of this years draft class, only catcher Steve Yeager, drafted in the fourth round, made any impact in the Majors. He played with the Dodgers from 1972–1985 and hit 102 home runs during his career.

Notes

References 
Baseball-Reference season page
Baseball Almanac season page

External links 
1967 Los Angeles Dodgers uniform
Los Angeles Dodgers official web site

Los Angeles Dodgers seasons
Los Angeles Dodgers season
Los Angel